Under the current Sharia law, women's football in Brunei Darussalam is prohibited. Though women were banned from playing, football was the second most popular sport in the country for women. There are no registered female players in the country. While there is officially no support for women's football in the country, only foreign girls at Berakas International School are allowed to play within the school campus. There are also some women futsal teams set up as regional representatives on occasion.

Team
The country's kit colours are gold shirts, black shorts, and gold socks.

As of 2019, the women's national team has not competed at the Women's World Cup. In 2005, the country was one of seven teams that included Thailand, Indonesia, East Timor, Malaysia, Cambodia, Laos, Vietnam, Myanmar and Singapore, that were expected to field a women's football team to compete at the Southeast Asian Games in Marikina in December. As of 2006, there was no official senior a team or junior national team. In March 2012, the team was not ranked in the world by FIFA.

References

Football in Brunei
Brunei national football team
Women's sport in Brunei